Laber or Laaber is an element in Bavarian place names which goes back to the word Labera meaning "foaming water". The spellings Laber and Laaber are interchangeable in older texts, and are still not always consistently distinguished today. It may refer to:

Usually spelled Laber
Bachhaupter Laber, a river in Bavaria, Germany
Breitenbrunner Laber, a river in Bavaria, Germany
Große Laber, a river in Bavaria, Germany
Kleine Laber, a river in Bavaria, Germany
Schwarze Laber, a river in Bavaria, Germany
Weiße Laber, a river in Bavaria, Germany
Wissinger Laber, a river in Bavaria, Germany
Labertal ('Laber valley'), the river valley of any of the above
Labertaler, a brand of mineral water produced in Regensburg

Usually spelled Laaber
Laaber, a market town in Bavaria, Germany, in the district of Regensburg, situated on the Schwarze Laber
Laaber-Verlag, a publishing house based in Laaber (Regensburg).
 Laaber, a village in Bavaria near Pilsach in the district of Neumarkt, source of the Schwarze Laber.
 Laaber, a village in Bavaria near Rohr in Niederbayern in the district of Kehlheim.

German words and phrases